Megarthridia is a monotypic snout moth genus described by E. L. Martin in 1956. Its single species, described by George Hampson in 1896, Megarthridia canosparsalis, is known from Burma and India (Sikkim).

References

Megarthridiini
Monotypic moth genera
Moths of Asia
Pyralidae genera